Quzhdabad (also Romanized as Qūzhdābād) is a village in Jolgeh Rural District Rural District, Shahrabad District, Bardaskan County, Razavi Khorasan Province, Iran. At the 2006 census, its population was 627, in 178 families.

References 

Populated places in Bardaskan County